Georges Creek is a  long 3rd order tributary to the Deep River in Chatham County, North Carolina.

Course
Georges Creek rises about 2 miles northeast of Goldston, North Carolina in Chatham County and then flows southeast to the Deep River about 0.5 miles east of Farmville, North Carolina.

Watershed
Georges Creek drains  of area, receives about 47.5 in/year of precipitation, and has a wetness index of 426.24 and is about 65% forested.

See also
List of rivers of North Carolina

References

Rivers of North Carolina
Rivers of Chatham County, North Carolina